Pashti is a flatbread common to the Southern Indian subcontinent. It is usually made with rice flour, pan fried in ghee / cooking oil. A pashti is usually served with either chutneys, usually peanut (Phalli Ki Chutney) or with curry.

Pashti is made by kneading rice flour in hot water, as cold water tends to form lumps.
The dough is then rolled out with rolling pins, and circles are cut out by pressing a plate or jar top onto the dough.

See also

 Kerala Porotta
 List of Indian breads

References

Flatbreads
Unleavened breads
Indian breads
Hyderabadi cuisine
Telangana cuisine
South Indian cuisine
Indian rice dishes
Pancakes
Rice breads